Keri Lynn Pratt (born September 23, 1978) is an American film and television actress. She is best known for her role as Missy Belknap in Jack & Bobby and as Dee Vine in the film, Drive Me Crazy; which was her debut role.

Personal life
Pratt, who was born in Concord, New Hampshire, graduated from Pinkerton Academy in Derry. She married John Barneson in October 2011 at Hampstead Congregational Church in Hampstead, New Hampshire.

Career
Pratt was a student at the Hampstead Dance Academy, and after graduation began her career at the Broadway Dance Center.  She was Miss New Hampshire Teen USA 1994 and competed in the Miss Teen USA 1994 pageant. She has guest starred on such series as CSI: Crime Scene Investigation, ER, House, Bones, Veronica Mars, Law and Order: Special Victims Unit, Nip/Tuck, 7th Heaven, That '70s Show, and Sabrina the Teenage Witch. In 2005, she portrayed a 16-year-old girl named Lauren Westley on Law & Order: Special Victims Unit, even though Pratt was 27 at the time. 

In 2006 she appeared in four episodes of the ABC's television series Brothers & Sisters, as an intern to Calista Flockhart and Josh Hopkins's characters. In July 2008, Pratt was cast as Kristy in the 2009 film I Hope They Serve Beer In Hell. Between 2010 and 2011, she played reporter Cat Grant in four episodes of Smallville. Not as active since 2012, Pratt appeared in the 2014 webseries of four, two-minute long, webisodes The Originals: The Awakening.

Filmography

Film

Television

Web

References

External links

1978 births
Living people
20th-century American actresses
21st-century American actresses
Actresses from New Hampshire
American film actresses
American television actresses
1994 beauty pageant contestants
20th-century Miss Teen USA delegates
People from Concord, New Hampshire
Pinkerton Academy alumni